Billy Ace Barratt (born 16 June 2007) is an English actor. At the age of 13, he became the youngest person to win an International Emmy Award.

Early life
Billy Ace Barratt was born in Brixton, London. His mother is actress and presenter Carolyn Owlett, who is a member of girl band The 411, whilst his grandfather is Welsh singer Shakin' Stevens.

Career
Barratt began acting in television roles. He made his film debut in To Dream, released in 2016. In 2018 he landed a small part in the 2018 film Mary Poppins Returns, played a Street children. In 2019, he plays Ray in Responsible Child'', which tells the fictional story about a 10-year-old who is charged with murder, and questions whether a child can be held responsible for their actions. On 23 November 2020, Barratt won the International Emmy Award for Best Actor for his role in the film, becoming the youngest person ever to do so.

Filmography

Film

Television

References

External links

21st-century English male actors
English male film actors
Living people
English male child actors
2007 births